Edmund Bede "Ted" Maher  (8 June 1891 – 31 December 1982) was an Australian politician, Leader of the Opposition in the Parliament of Queensland 1936 to 1941 and Federal senator 1950 to 1965.

Born in Forbes, New South Wales, he was educated at Catholic schools before becoming a post office worker and stock agent. In 1921, he moved to Queensland, becoming a grazier, as well as a businessman and company director. In 1929 he was elected to the Legislative Assembly of Queensland as the Country Party member for Rosewood, transferring to West Moreton in 1932. He served as Leader of the Opposition and Leader of the Country Party from 1936 to 1941. 

Maher was the last leader of his party who did not become Premier until Mike Horan (served 2001-2003, with the party now being known as the National Party).

In 1949 he left the Assembly and was elected to the Australian Senate as a Country Party Senator for Queensland. He remained in the Senate until his retirement in 1964, taking effect in 1965. Maher died in 1982.

References

National Party of Australia members of the Parliament of Australia
Members of the Australian Senate for Queensland
Members of the Australian Senate
1891 births
1982 deaths
Leaders of the Opposition in Queensland
20th-century Australian politicians